Martin Elmiger (born 23 September 1978) is a Swiss former road racing cyclist, who rode professionally between 2001 and 2017 for the Post Swiss Team,  and  squads. During his career, Elmiger was a four-time winner of the Swiss National Road Race Championships.

Career

Early career
Born in Hagendorn, Elmiger's sporting career began with RMV Cham-Hagendorn.

AG2R Prévoyance (2007–12)
One of the best moments in Elmiger's career was leading the 2007 Tour Down Under for 2 stages and then winning it by a mere 3 seconds over Australian Karl Menzies. He started the UCI ProTour strongly with a 19th place in E3 Prijs Vlaanderen, 17th in Gent–Wevelgem and 24th in Paris–Roubaix after crashing. On stage 2 of the Tour de Romandie, Elmiger finished 5th behind stage winner Robbie McEwen in the wake of a massive pileup involving several riders at high speed. Elmiger started the Tour de Suisse strongly with a 7th place in the prologue, finishing 10.82 seconds behind Fabian Cancellara and in front of riders like Andreas Klöden and Michael Rogers.

IAM Cycling (2013–16)
Elmiger left  at the end of the 2012 season, and joined the new  team for the 2013 season.

Major results

2000
 1st Stausee-Rundfahrt Klingnau
 6th Rund um den Henninger Turm U23
2001
 1st  Road race, National Road Championships
 3rd Stausee-Rundfahrt Klingnau
 8th Tour du Lac Léman
2002
 1st Circuito de Getxo
 4th GP Ouest–France
 4th Boucles de l'Aulne
 4th Stausee-Rundfahrt Klingnau
2003
 1st Grand Prix of Aargau Canton
 2nd Circuito de Getxo
 2nd Gran Premio Bruno Beghelli
 2nd Stausee-Rundfahrt Klingnau
 7th Coppa Sabatini
 8th Giro del Lazio
2004
 1st Stage 3 Tour du Languedoc-Roussillon
 2nd Grand Prix Pino Cerami
 2nd Paris–Bourges
 3rd Grand Prix of Aargau Canton
2005
 National Road Championships
1st  Road race
2nd Time trial
 1st Stage 1 (TTT) Volta a Catalunya
 6th HEW Cyclassics
 7th Tour de Berne
 8th Giro di Lombardia
 10th Road race, UCI Road World Championships
2006
 2nd Trofeo Mallorca
 5th Trofeo Magaluf-Palmanova
 9th Milan–San Remo
2007
 1st  Overall Tour Down Under
 1st Grand Prix d'Isbergues
 3rd Grand Prix de la Somme
 8th Gran Premio di Chiasso
 9th Giro della Romagna
 10th Road race, UCI Road World Championships
2008
 2nd Road race, National Road Championships
 2nd Grand Prix of Aargau Canton
 3rd Overall Tour de Picardie
1st Stage 2
 7th Dwars door Vlaanderen
2009
 3rd Monte Paschi Strade Bianche
 4th Overall Tour Down Under
 5th Overall Circuit de Lorraine
 8th Tour de Vendée
 9th Tour of Flanders
2010
 National Road Championships
1st  Road race
3rd Time trial
 1st  Overall Four Days of Dunkirk
1st Stage 4
 1st Grand Prix de la Somme
 3rd Overall Tour du Poitou-Charentes
2011
 5th Overall Tour du Poitou-Charentes
2012
 3rd Time trial, National Road Championships
 10th Overall Four Days of Dunkirk
 10th Overall Tour de Luxembourg
 10th Grand Prix of Aargau Canton
2013
 1st  Overall Tour du Limousin
1st Stage 1
 National Road Championships
2nd Road race
2nd Time trial
 2nd Overall Tour of Britain
1st  Points classification
 8th Overall Four Days of Dunkirk
 9th Overall Bayern–Rundfahrt
2014
 1st  Road race, National Road Championships
 6th Overall Tour du Poitou-Charentes
 7th Overall Arctic Race of Norway
  Combativity award Stages 7 & 15 Tour de France
2015
 5th Overall Tour of Belgium
 5th Paris–Roubaix
 10th Tour of Flanders
2016
 1st  Best Swiss rider classification Tour de Suisse
 4th Overall Arctic Race of Norway

Grand Tour general classification results timeline

References

External links

 
 
 
 
 
 
 
 

1978 births
Living people
Swiss male cyclists
Cyclists at the 2004 Summer Olympics
Cyclists at the 2012 Summer Olympics
Olympic cyclists of Switzerland
People from Cham, Switzerland
Sportspeople from the canton of Zug